Vršovice is a district of Prague. All of Vršovice lies within the Prague 10 administrative district. Vršovice is located south-east of the city centre. It borders Vinohrady to the north, Nusle to the south-west, Michle to the south and Strašnice to the east. The name is first mentioned in 1088 in the founding document of the Vyšehrad Chapter. In 1922 the district was incorporated into the city of Prague. It has 107 streets and 1,611 addresses and has about 38,700 inhabitants.

A train station, Praha-Vršovice (formerly known as Nusle), serves this part of the city. There is a shopping centre in Vršovice, called Eden and the Koh-i-Noor Waldes factory, which is a manufacturer of buttons and press-studs. It should not be confused with the Czech company Koh-i-Noor Hardtmuth, one of the world's largest producers and distributors of pencils and office supplies. In a 2016 travel feature about the district, The New York Times identified Vršovice as "one of the capital’s 'it' neighborhoods."

Some of the most notable people born there are Michael Stevens, Dominik Hlavacka, Johnny Studnicny and Krystof Hanzal.

Sport
There are two professional football teams in the area: SK Slavia Prague and Bohemians 1905. Slavia uses the Eden Arena, which is the largest football stadium in the Czech Republic and Bohemians 1905 the Ďolíček Stadium. There are also teams playing in the lower leagues, for example SK Union Vršovice.

Churches
There are two Roman Catholic churches, St. Wenceslas Church, completed in 1930, and one dedicated to St. Nicholas which dates from 1374. Since 1930 there has been the Hus' House which has also included a theatre in the past.

Gallery

References

Districts of Prague